Valley Lodge is the debut studio album by the American power pop band Valley Lodge, released in 2005. It was re-released in Japan in September, 2008 with three bonus tracks.

Track listing
"Every Little Thing" - 3:19
"Sold" - 2:47
"If It Takes All Night" - 4:39
"All Of My Loving" - 2:54
"Over It" - 3:16
"Hey" - 2:48
"Comin' Around" - 3:15
"Naked City" - 3:05
"Twenty-First Century Man" - 3:56
"Hanging On" - 4:17
"Cruel" - 3:28
"That Song" - 3:43
"Planetarium" - 4:09

Japanese Bonus Tracks
"Comin' Around"
"My Baby"
"Barricade"

Personnel
Dave Hill - vocals, guitar
John Kimbrough - vocals, guitar
Phil Costello - vocals, bass guitar
Rob Pfeiffer - drums
Candice Belanoff - bass guitar on 'Planetarium' and 'Naked City'

2005 albums
Valley Lodge (band) albums